Eisenhower vs. Stevenson may refer to one of two United States presidential elections won by Dwight D. Eisenhower against Adlai Stevenson II:

 1952 United States presidential election, won by Dwight D. Eisenhower against Adlai Stevenson II
 1956 United States presidential election, won by Dwight D. Eisenhower against Adlai Stevenson II